Hard Rock Radio is a Bosnian local commercial radio station, broadcasting from Banja Luka, Bosnia and Herzegovina. This radio station broadcasts a variety of programs such as urban and hard rock music with local news. The owner of the radio station is the company Radio Bulevar d.o.o. Banja Luka.

Under this name, Hard Rock Radio was launched on 14 November 2002 when local radio station Radio Bulevar was rebranded.

The program is mainly produced in Serbian at one FM frequency (Banja Luka ) and it is available in the city of Banja Luka as well as in nearby municipalities Laktaši, Čelinac, Prnjavor, Bosanska Gradiška/Gradiška and Kotor Varoš.

Estimated number of listeners of Hard Rock Radio is around 183.650.

Frequencies
 Banja Luka

See also 
 List of radio stations in Bosnia and Herzegovina
 Big Radio 1
 Radio A
 Pop FM
 Plavi FM
 RSG Radio

References

External links 
 www.hardrockradio.ba
 www.radiostanica.ba
 www.fmscan.org
 Communications Regulatory Agency of Bosnia and Herzegovina

Radio stations in Bosnia and Herzegovina
Radio stations established in 2002
Mass media in Banja Luka